The 1890 Orange Athletic Club football team was an American football team that represented the Orange Athletic Club in the American Football Union (AFU) during the 1890 football season. The Orange team played its home games in East Orange, New Jersey, and compiled a 5–4–1 record (3–1 against AFU opponents).

Schedule

References

Orange Athletic Club
Orange Athletic Club football seasons
Orange Athletic Club football